Sakubva Stadium is a multi-use stadium located in Sakubva township in Mutare, Zimbabwe.  It is currently used mostly for football matches, on club level by Mutare City Rovers F.C. of the Zimbabwe Premier Soccer League. The stadium has a capacity of 20,000 spectators.

See also 
 Mutare
 Sakubva

References

Mutare
Sakubva
Football venues in Zimbabwe
Stadiums in Zimbabwe
Buildings and structures in Manicaland Province